Bielkowo may refer to the following places:
Bielkowo, Gdańsk County in Pomeranian Voivodeship (north Poland)
Bielkowo, Koszalin County in West Pomeranian Voivodeship (north-west Poland)
Bielkowo, Stargard County in West Pomeranian Voivodeship (north-west Poland)
Bielkowo (PKP station)